Colleretto Castelnuovo is a comune (municipality) in the Metropolitan City of Turin in the Italian region of Piedmont, located about  north of Turin.

Colleretto Castelnuovo borders the following municipalities: Castellamonte, Cintano, Borgiallo, and Castelnuovo Nigra.

References

Cities and towns in Piedmont